Bruneian Malays are a native Malay ethnic group that lives in Brunei, the federal territory of Labuan, the southwestern coast of Sabah and the northern parts of Sarawak. The Bruneian Malays are a subgroup of the larger ethnic Malay population found in the other parts of the Malay World, namely Peninsular Malaysia and the central and southern areas of Sarawak including neighbouring lands such as Singapore, Indonesia and Southern Thailand, having visible differences especially in language and culture, even though they are ethnically related to each other and follow the teachings of Islam. All Bruneian Malays who are born or domiciled in East Malaysia even for generations before or after the independence of the states of Sabah and Sarawak from the British Empire through the formation of Malaysia in 1963 are also considered Malaysian Malays in the national census and were in the same status like the Malaysian Malays domiciled in Peninsular Malaysian states and the central and southern parts of Sarawak. They are also defined as a part of the Bumiputera racial classification together as a subgroup within the Malaysian Malay ethnic population along with the Kadazan-Dusuns, Ibans, Malaccan Portuguese and the Malaysian Siamese.

Etymology

As per an official statistics, the "Bruneian Malays" term only became official after the 1921 Brunei Ethnic Categories Census, which is different from the 1906 and 1911 census which only mentioned "Barunays" (Brunei's or Bruneian). It is possibly indicated a shift on the self-perception by the Bruneians about their Malay identity.

The earliest recorded documentation by the West about Brunei is by an Italian known as Ludovico di Varthema, who also said the "Bruneian people have fairer skin tone than the peoples he met in Maluku Islands". On his documentation back to 1550;

We arrived at the island of Bornei (Brunei or Borneo), which is distant from the Maluch about two hundred miles, and we found that it was somewhat larger than the aforesaid and much lower. The people are pagans and are men of goodwill. Their colour is whiter than that of the other sort....in this island justice is well administered...

Some historians have suggested that Bruneian Malay have been linked with the Chinese mainland due to its historical sources dependent on Chinese support.

History

Origin
It is widely believed that the Brunei Kingdom was founded in 14th century by the first Sultan, Alak 
Batatar. However, from the Chinese records, an older Brunei was in existence as far back as 800 years before the founding of Brunei by Sultan Muhammad Shah, the first Sultan of Brunei. Even though some sources stated that the Malays of Brunei came from Yunnan and the Formosa Island (now Taiwan) through to the Philippines and settled on the coastal Borneo before expanding into Sumatra and Indochina countries like Malay Peninsula, Thailand, Cambodia and Vietnam as a result of their trading and seafaring way of life, researchers are still unable to trace the origin of the old Brunei.

Cultures

Cuisine

As the official Brunei national dish, the Ambuyat is the main dish of the Bruneian Malays together with a number of types of snack such as lamban, punjung and many more.

Music

The main song and dance performed by this ethnic both in Brunei and Malaysia is the Adai-adai, which was traditionally sung by the Bruneian fishermens.

See also
 Brunei Malay
 Brunei Malay wedding
 Kedayan
 Bisaya
 Murut

References

Notes

Books
 , 1971.
 Mohd.
 Sabihah Osman, Muhamad Hadi Abdullah, Sabullah Hj.

Malay people
Ethnic groups in Sabah
Ethnic groups in Sarawak
Ethnic groups in Brunei